North Country Hospital is a Critical Access Hospital in Newport City, Vermont.

It was founded in 1919. It is run by a board of trustees.
Claudio Fort is president and CEO. The hospital was the only one in Vermont in 2007 to achieve 100% on all Medicaid and Medicare quality measures.

Operations
The hospital billed patients $141 million in 2010, and collected $76.5 million. Their operating expense was $75 million.

The chief executive officer is Brian Nall.

The hospital had 605 employees in 2011.

The hospital directly employs about 75% of its professional medical staff.

History
The hospital was founded in 1919. After fundraising, construction began on Longview Street in May 1922. On July 1, 1924, the 24-bed hospital opened as Orleans County Memorial Hospital, with five full-time employees and a nursing school. It ultimately grew to 72 beds in a  building.

In the early 1970s, Orleans and Essex County  worked to raise funds for a new hospital. It had 80 beds, an OB/GYN department, pediatrics ward, intensive care/coronary unit, quarters for radiology, laboratory, physical therapy, a fully staffed 24-hour emergency service department, and a then-modern surgical suite. It cost $5 million, raised mostly from government funding.

Since 1974, additional facilities have included an imaging services, physical therapy, library, information systems, ambulatory surgery suites, birthing rooms, a mobile MRI site, and three new buildings for physician practices in a medical village adjacent to the hospital.

Medical practice changed over the years. There was no longer a need for a high inpatient, long-length of stay facility.

In September, 2001 the hospital broke ground for the largest building project since the hospital was built. It was completed in 2003. The  addition included a surgical suite, new emergency department with indoor ambulance bays, outpatient services, and central sterilization and distribution department.

In 2006, a dialysis center opened in the  ground floor space under the ED.

The hospital had a $55 million budget in 2007. Salaries were $24 million. Supplies cost $14 million.

CEOs/Hospital Administrators
Alice Grant
Anna Terhune
Tom Dowd 1971+
James Cassidy
Sid Toll
Karen Weller ? - 2008
Claudio Fort 2009-

Footnotes 

Hospital buildings completed in 1924
Hospitals in Vermont
Buildings and structures in Newport (city), Vermont
Hospitals established in 1919
Non-profit organizations based in Vermont
1919 establishments in Vermont